Glenn Hasenfratz Griswold (January 20, 1890 – December 5, 1940) was an American lawyer and politician who served four terms as a U.S. Representative from Indiana from 1931 to 1939.

Biography
Born in New Haven, Missouri, Griswold attended public schools. He moved to Peru, Indiana, in 1911. He attended Valparaiso (Indiana) Law School. He was admitted to the bar in 1917 and commenced practice in Peru, Indiana.
During the First World War, he served in the United States Army as a private in Company B, Fourth Regiment Casual Detachment. After the war he became the city attorney of Peru, Indiana from 1921 to 1925. He served as prosecuting attorney of Miami County, Indiana, in 1925 and 1926. He served as a member of the Indiana Railroad Commission in 1930.

Griswold was elected as a Democrat to the Seventy-second and to the three succeeding Congresses (March 4, 1931 – January 3, 1939).
He was an unsuccessful candidate for reelection in 1938 to the Seventy-sixth Congress.
Reengaged in the practice of law in Peru, Indiana, until his death there on December 5, 1940.
He was interred in Mount Hope Cemetery in Peru, Indiana.

References

1890 births
1940 deaths
United States Army soldiers
Democratic Party members of the United States House of Representatives from Indiana
20th-century American politicians